Ihar Pashevich (born 8 December 1991) is a Belarusian rower. He won the silver medal in the coxless four at the 2016 European Rowing Championships. He also competed in rowing at the 2016 Summer Olympics.

References

External links
 
 

1991 births
Living people
Belarusian male rowers
Olympic rowers of Belarus
Rowers at the 2016 Summer Olympics
European Rowing Championships medalists